Fort Lane Military Post was a U.S. Army fort in Jackson County in southern Oregon built in the fall of 1853.  The Fort was occupied by several companies of the 1st Regiment of U.S. Dragoons during the Rogue River War. Its site was listed on the National Register of Historic Places in 1988.

See also
National Register of Historic Places listings in Jackson County, Oregon

References

External links
The Oregonian article
Seattle Times article
Fort Lane at The Oregon Encyclopedia

Former populated places in Jackson County, Oregon
Forts in Oregon
National Register of Historic Places in Jackson County, Oregon
Forts on the National Register of Historic Places in Oregon
Archaeological sites on the National Register of Historic Places in Oregon